Jan Smuts became South African Prime Minister for the second time in 1939, following a split in the United Party. 
He appointed members of the United Party, Dominion Party and Labour Party to positions in his Cabinet.

Ministers

First Smuts Cabinet
The 1938 general election was won by the United Party, giving J. B. M. Hertzog a fourth consecutive term. In September 1939, the United Party was divided between supporters of Hertzog and those of his Justice Minister Jan Smuts. The split resulted from differences between supporters of neutrality in World War II and those who wanted South Africa to follow the United Kingdom and declare war against Nazi Germany. Finally, Hertzog was outvoted within the United Party and Parliament. He resigned his post as Prime Minister, allowing Jan Smuts to form a new government in coalition with the Dominion Party and Labour Party.

Second Smuts Cabinet

See also
 Prime Minister of South Africa

References

Government of South Africa
Executive branch of the government of South Africa
Cabinets of South Africa
1939 establishments in South Africa
1948 disestablishments in South Africa
Cabinets established in 1939
Cabinets disestablished in 1948
Jan Smuts